Pajay is a commune in the Isère department in southeastern France. It is about 50 km southeast of Lyon.

Population

See also
Communes of the Isère department

References

Communes of Isère
Isère communes articles needing translation from French Wikipedia